Geir Otto Pedersen (born 28 September 1955) is a Norwegian diplomat, who is currently the United Nations Special Envoy for Syria.

Career
Born in Oslo, Pedersen is a cand.philol. by education and started working for the Norwegian Ministry of Foreign Affairs in 1985. 

In 1993, Pedersen was a member of the Norwegian team to the Oslo negotiations, which led to the signing of the Declaration of Principles and  mutual recognition between the Palestine Liberation Organization (PLO) and Israel. In the following years, from 1995 to 1998, Pedersen held several positions at the Norwegian Ministry of Foreign Affairs. In 1998, he was posted abroad, serving as the Norwegian Representative to the Palestinian Authority. 

Pedersen later worked for the United Nations in several roles, which included as the Personal Representative of the United Nations Secretary-General for Southern Lebanon from 2005 to 2007, and following as the Special Coordinator for Lebanon from 2007 to 2008. He also served the United Nations as Director of the Asia and Pacific Division in the Department of Political Affairs.

He returned to the Ministry of Foreign Affairs as deputy under-secretary of state, then served as Norway's ambassador to the United Nations from 2012 to 2017 and to China from 2017 to 2018. 

In January 2019, he started a tenure as the United Nations Special Envoy to Syria.

Personal life
Pedersen is married and has five children.

References

1955 births
Living people
Diplomats from Oslo
Norwegian expatriates in Israel
Norwegian expatriates in Lebanon
Permanent Representatives of Norway to the United Nations
Ambassadors of Norway to China
United Nations officials
Special Representatives of the Secretary-General of the United Nations
Special Envoys of the Secretary-General of the United Nations